Tecno Mobile is a Chinese mobile phone manufacturer based in Shenzhen, China. It was established in 2006. It is a subsidiary of Transsion Holdings.

Tecno has focused its business on the African, Middle East, Southeast Asian, South Asian, Latin American, and Eastern European markets.

History

In 2006, Tecno Mobile was founded as Tecno Telecom Limited, but later changed its name to Transsion Holdings with Tecno Mobile serving as one of its subsidiaries. In 2007, Tecno created a second brand, Itel that sold in Africa. In early 2008, Tecno focused entirely to Africa following market research, and by 2010, it was among the top three mobile phone brands in Africa.

In 2016, Tecno entered the Middle East mobile phone market. In 2017, it entered the Indian market, launching its ‘Made for India’ smartphones: the ‘i’ series - i5, i5 Pro, i3, i3 Pro and i7. The company initially started in Rajasthan, Gujarat, and Punjab, and by December 2017 was spread across the country.

The firm has identified other emerging markets, besides Africa and India, with large populations but low purchasing power. It entered the Bangladesh and Nepal markets in 2017 and has started trial sales in Pakistan. It is still trying to penetrate the Pakistani market and has started its sales online through various E-commerce channels including its own website.

Product manufacturing

The Tecno mobile phones sold in India are assembled in their manufacturing facility in Noida (U.P.).

References

External links

Display technology companies
Mobile phone companies of China
Telecommunication equipment companies of China
Mobile phone manufacturers
Networking hardware companies
Multinational companies headquartered in China
Manufacturing companies based in Shenzhen
Electronics companies established in 2006
Manufacturing companies established in 2006
Chinese companies established in 2006
Privately held companies of China
Chinese brands
Transsion